Let's Start a War, or Let's Start a War... (Said Maggie One Day), is the third album by Scottish punk band The Exploited, released in 1983 through Pax Records. The title refers to Margaret Thatcher's decision to go to war over the Falkland Islands in 1982, suggesting that she did so almost on a whim. The controversial war was fodder for many protest songs in the punk movement. It was reissued on Captain Oi! Records in 2001, which featured three tracks from their Rival Leaders EP.

Lyrical themes
Being The Exploited's most politically-charged album, the lyrics on the album talk about subjects such as Margaret Thatcher's decision to go to war over the Falkland Islands, anti-war, police-driven riots, war, unemployment and hopelessness.

Despite the album's lyrics questioning the Falklands War, The Exploited later announced on stage at a gig in Argentina that the Falklands were British forever.

Track listing
 All tracks written by Wattie Buchan and Big John Duncan, unless otherwise stated.
Side one
 "Let's Start a War (Said Maggie One Day)" – 3:13
 "Insanity" – 4:19
 "Safe Below" – 2:17
 "Eyes of the Vulture" – 4:01
 "Should We, Can't We" –  1:41
 "Rival Leaders" –  2:43
Side two
 "God Saved the Queen" (Buchan) –  5:43
 "Psycho" –  2:01
 "Kidology" –  2:09
 "False Hopes" (Buchan) –  1:39
 "Another Day to Go Nowhere" (Buchan) –  2:31
 "Wankers" (Buchan) –  2:37

Personnel
The Exploited
Wattie Buchan – vocals
John Duncan – guitar
Wayne Tyas – bass
Willie Buchan – drums

Production
Barry Sage and Stewart Picking – engineering, mixing
Marcus Featherby – producer
Brian Burrows – sleeve remix
Mark Brennan – liner notes
Mixed at Southern Studios
Recorded at Revolution Studios
Distributed by Red Rhino and The Cartel

References

 

1983 albums
The Exploited albums
Captain Oi! Records albums
Cultural depictions of Margaret Thatcher
Songs about Margaret Thatcher